"Back There" is episode 49 of the American television anthology series The Twilight Zone. It originally aired on January 13, 1961 on CBS, and was the 13th episode of the second season. It was written by series creator Rod Serling and was directed by David Orrick McDearmon. It involves time travel, and stars Russell Johnson, who had appeared in another time-travel episode the previous season.

Opening narration

Plot
On April 14, 1961, young engineer Peter Corrigan is involved in a discussion with colleagues at the elite Potomac Club on the question of time travel. After bumping into William, a familiar attendant, on the way out, Peter feels faint. Confused by the gas lamps and horse-drawn carriages on the street, he notices that he's wearing clothes of a much older style and walks home. He finds that his home is now a boarding house. In discussion with the strangers he meets there, he discovers that he has been transported back in time to April 14, 1865, the date of the assassination of Abraham Lincoln by John Wilkes Booth.

Corrigan rushes to Ford's Theatre to warn everyone but is arrested for disturbing the peace. Only one officer believes Corrigan, but is overruled by his superior. After he has been held in the police station a short time, a man who states he is a doctor with expertise in mental illness arrives. He introduces himself as Jonathan Wellington and persuades the police to release Corrigan into his custody. Wellington subsequently drugs Corrigan, before leaving and locking the door. Wellington is later identified by the landlady as John Wilkes Booth, and the handkerchief he left behind bears the initials JWB; outside the news is spreading that the president has just been shot. Everyone realizes Peter wasn’t lying.

Corrigan pounds his fist on a window sill angry that no one listened and finds he is back in 1961 at the Potomac Club. It seems the same, but there is no longer an attendant named William. Back at the table with his colleagues, he finds that the scholarly discussion has moved from time travel to money, and William is also at the table participating. William says that his money was inherited from his great-grandfather, a policeman who had made a name for himself by predicting the assassination of Lincoln, becoming Chief of Police, then a councilman, and eventually becoming a millionaire through real estate. Overwhelmed by all that has happened, Peter steps aside to wipe his brow with the handkerchief in his pocket and notices the initials: JWB.

Closing narration

Cast
 Russell Johnson as Peter Corrigan
 Paul Hartman as Police Sergeant
 John Lasell as Jonathan Wellington
 Bartlett Robinson as William
 Nora Marlowe as Chambermaid
 Raymond Bailey as Millard
 Raymond Greenleaf as Jackson

See also
 Fatalism
 Predestination
 List of The Twilight Zone (1959 TV series) episodes
 Season 2
 The Twilight Zone (2002 TV series) (episode 32 "Memphis")

References
 DeVoe, Bill. (2008). Trivia from The Twilight Zone. Albany, GA: Bear Manor Media. 
 Grams, Martin. (2008). The Twilight Zone: Unlocking the Door to a Television Classic. Churchville, MD: OTR Publishing.

External links
 
 TV.com episode page

The Twilight Zone (1959 TV series season 2) episodes
Fictional depictions of Abraham Lincoln in television
Cultural depictions of John Wilkes Booth
Television episodes about assassinations
Television episodes about time travel
1961 American television episodes
Television episodes written by Rod Serling
Fiction set in 1865
Fiction set in 1961
Television episodes set in Washington, D.C.
Television episodes set in the 1860s
Television episodes set in the 1960s